The Gosper County Courthouse, at 507 Smith Ave. in Elwood, Nebraska, was built in 1939.  It was designed by architects McClure & Walker with Art Deco style.

It was listed on the National Register of Historic Places in 1990.  It was deemed historically significant for its architecture and for its association with politics and local government;  it was one of seven Nebraska courthouses built by New Deal programs.

References

External links 

Courthouses on the National Register of Historic Places in Nebraska
Art Deco architecture in Nebraska
Government buildings completed in 1939
Buildings and structures in Gosper County, Nebraska
County courthouses in Nebraska
National Register of Historic Places in Gosper County, Nebraska
Public Works Administration in Nebraska